or  is an island in Troms og Finnmark county, Norway. The island is situated on the east side of the Lyngen fjord and it is divided between Skjervøy and Nordreisa municipalities. The population (2001) on the Skjervøy part of the island is 29, and the population (2001) on the Nordreisa part is 65. The two sides of the island are not connected by road.

Uløya is the 56th largest island in Norway. All of the island of Uløya was originally in Skjervøy municipality, but in 1972 the southern part of the island was transferred to neighboring Nordreisa municipality.

Villages
Villages include Havnnes.

See also
 List of islands of Norway by area
 List of islands of Norway

References

External links
Havnnesfestivalen 
Nord-Troms Museum: Havnnes-årets kulturlandskap 

Skjervøy
Nordreisa
Islands of Troms og Finnmark